Mijači is a village in the Brestovac municipality of the Požega-Slavonia County, Croatia. According to the 2001 census, there were 18 inhabitants in the village. The village is connected by the D38 state road.

History
The village was known as Mihači until 1900.

During the World War II in Yugoslavia, in 1943, the Yugoslav Partisans formed the 18th National Liberation Brigade in the village, in which the fighters of the 1st and 2nd Slavonian NOP Units, including the whole 2nd Band of the 2nd Battalion of the 2nd NOP Unit were joined.  In 1944, the Croatian fascist Ustaše had set up camp in the village, with 45 soldiers, and the Partisan Ljubuški battalion had driven them out after an hour.

In the prelude of the Croatian War, the village was part of the SAO Western Slavonia, and subsequently the Republic of Serbian Krajina.

1857: 115
1869: 130
1880: 166
1890: 133
1900: 172
1910: 371
1921: 205
1931: 281

Sources

Populated places in Požega-Slavonia County